The anti-fracking movement is a political movement that seeks to ban the practice of extracting natural gasses from shale rock formations to provide power due to its negative environmental impact. These effects include the contamination of drinking water, disruption of ecosystems, and adverse effects on human and animal health. Additionally, the practice of fracking increases the amount of carbon dioxide released into the atmosphere, escalating the process of climate change and global warming. An anti-fracking movement has emerged both internationally, with involvement of international environmental organizations, and nation states such as France and locally in affected areas such as Balcombe, Sussex, in the UK, Pungești in Romania, Žygaičiai in Lithuania, and In Salah in Algeria. Through the use of direct action, media, and lobbying, the Anti-Fracking movement is focused on holding the gas and oil industry accountable for past and potential environmental damage, extracting compensation from and taxation of the industry to mitigate impact, and regulation of gas development and drilling activity.

Europe

UK
The Frack Off campaign is a grassroots direct action against unconventional gas and oil extraction.

On 26 September 2018, three men blocked a convoy of trucks carrying drilling equipment to a site near Blackpool. Two were sentenced to 16 months in prison and the third 15 months, after being convicted of causing a public nuisance. A fourth defendant was given a 12-month suspended sentence after pleading guilty to the same offence. They were the first environmental activists to receive jail sentences for staging a protest in the UK since the Mass trespass of Kinder Scout in 1932. On 5 October, a spokeswoman for Robert Lizar Solicitors, representing the men, confirmed they would be lodging an appeal against sentence on the grounds the sentences were “wrong in principle and manifestly excessive”. On 17 October, all four men were released over the anti-fracking protest by Court of Appeal judges.

A timeline of events at the Plumpton Hall Farm site at Little Plumpton near Blackpool in Lanceshire has been complied by the independent, evidence-based publisher Drill Or Drop.

North America
 
Environmental concerns about fracking began to take hold in the United States when Josh Fox released Gasland in 2010, a documentary on the social and environmental impacts of fracking. Gasland, depicting the effect of hydraulic fracking on American homeowners near these sites, sparked an increased interest in the anti-fracking movement through the news coverage, social media content, and environmental activism that followed the film’s release. In 2011, the town of Dryden, New York became one of the first communities in the state to ban fracking in their community. This ban was initiated by grass roots activists of the Dryden Resource Awareness Coalition who began collecting signatures for a ballot measure in 2010. By 2014, 400 communities across the country had taken similar actions in their own towns. Notably, in 2014, New York City’s anti-fracking movement won a significant victory, managing to get Governor Cuomo to ban fracking in the state. This victory is due to the large number of environmental groups present and active in New York. In 2020, the New York state legislature codified a ban on fracking permanently into its 2021 budget, constituting a more substantial commitment to end fracking than the executive action taken by Governor Cuomo in 2014. This ban is due to years of grassroots organizing across the state of New York in which activists obtained tens of thousands of petition signatures and convinced 200 municipalities to pioneer their own anti-fracking initiatives.

Celebrity support has also been a notable part of the Anti-Fracking Movement. Actor Mark Ruffalo, who lives in New York City, became a major opponent to fracking. Ruffalo laid out his full case against fracking in a piece co-authored with Phil Radford on CNN.com, where he argued solar and wind sources of power are available now, and using fracked natural gas instead of cleaner sources of energy will result in more faucets on fire, methane leaks that cause global warming, groundwater contamination, and cancer causing chemicals in communities. In New York, more than 180 entertainment, music, film artists (including Lady Gaga, Robert de Niro, Mark Ruffalo, Paul McCartney, and Susan Sarandon) are recognized as members of Artists Against Fracking, a group that opposes fracking in the Marcellus shale.

In film
Split Estate (2009)
Gasland (2010)
Gasland: Part II (2013)
The Sky Is Pink (2013)
Groundswell Rising (2014)
Frack Off (UK)
Frackman (Australia, 2015)
Water is Life (Australia, 2018)

See also
2012–14 Romanian protests against shale gas
Artists Against Fracking
Balcombe drilling protest
Environmental impact of hydraulic fracturing
Frack Off
Refracktion

Notes and references

 
Environmentalism
Fossil fuels